Dietmar Danner (born 29 November 1950) is a German former professional footballer.

Club career 
Danner won three German championships and one DFB-Pokal title, as well as two UEFA Cup titles with Borussia Mönchengladbach, with whom he spent the majority of his playing career.

Danner was a part of Mönchengladbach during their golden period playing alongside players like Günter Netzer, Rainer Bonhof, Uli Stielike, Bertie Vogts, Allan Simonsen, Herbert Wimmer and Jupp Heynckes. Danner was an all around player in an adventurous, attacking, side. His career at the club and international level was cut short by an injury in 1976. Danner never regained full fitness and only played 49 more league games, including his final 19 with Schalke 04.

International career 
He earned six caps for the West Germany national team from 1973 to 1976. He missed out on being part of the 1974 World Cup winning West German squad but was included for the UEFA Euro 1976.

Honours
 UEFA Euro 1976 runner-up
 European Cup runner-up: 1976–77
 UEFA Cup:1974–75, 1978–79; runner-up: 1972–73, 1979–80
 Bundesliga: 1974–75, 1975–76, 1976–77; runner-up: 1973–74, 1977–78
 DFB-Pokal: 1972–73

References

External links
 
 
 
 

1950 births
Living people
German footballers
Germany international footballers
UEFA Euro 1976 players
Borussia Mönchengladbach players
FC Schalke 04 players
1. FC Saarbrücken players
LASK players
Bundesliga players
VfR Mannheim players
UEFA Cup winning players
Association football midfielders
Footballers from Mannheim
West German footballers
West German expatriate sportspeople in Austria
Expatriate footballers in Austria
West German expatriate footballers